Melinite or Mélinite may refer to: 

 Picric acid
 Jane Avril (1868–1943) La Mélinite, French cabaret star and can-can dancer